Justice Joseph Richard Asiedu (died before 1994) was a judge and also a Speaker of the Parliament of Ghana. He was appointed Speaker of Parliament in July 1960 in the First Republic of Ghana. He was the speaker until June 1965.

Notes

External links

Year of birth missing
Year of death missing
20th-century Ghanaian judges
Speakers of the Parliament of Ghana